The Second Coming: the Passion of Joe Panther is a Ned Kelly Award-winning novel by the Australian author Andrew Masterson, published in 2000.

Awards
Ned Kelly Awards for Crime Writing, Best Novel Award, 2001: joint winner

Reviews
 "Barcelona Review" 
 "Sofia" 

Australian crime novels
2000 novels
Ned Kelly Award-winning works